Gaćeša is a Serbo-Croatian surname. Notable people with the surname include:

 Aleksandar Gaćeša (born 1988), Serbian basketball player
 Dragan Gaćeša (born 1965), Serbian football player
 Nikica Gaćeša (born 1983), Croatian football player

Serbian surnames
Croatian surnames